The 2020–21 South Alabama Jaguars men's basketball team represented the University of South Alabama during the 2020–21 NCAA Division I men's basketball season. The Jaguars, led by third-year head coach Richie Riley, played their home games at the Mitchell Center in Mobile, Alabama as members in the Sun Belt Conference. With the creation of divisions to cut down on travel due to the ongoing COVID-19 pandemic, they played in the East division. They finished the season 17–11, 19–7 to finish in third place in the East division. They defeated Louisiana–Monroe in the first round of the Sun Belt tournament before losing to Louisiana in the quarterfinals.

Previous season
The Jaguars finished the 2019–20 season 20–11, 13–7 in Sun Belt play to finish in a tie for second place. They were set to be the No. 2 seed in the Sun Belt tournament, however, the tournament was canceled due to the COVID-19 pandemic.

Roster

Schedule and results

|-
!colspan=9 style=| Non-conference Regular Season

|-
!colspan=9 style=| Sun Belt regular season

|-
!colspan=9 style=| Sun Belt tournament

Source:

References

2019-20
2020–21 Sun Belt Conference men's basketball season
2021 in sports in Alabama
2020 in sports in Alabama